Cornel Damian (born May 8, 1960) is a Romanian cleric, auxiliary bishop of the Roman Catholic Archdiocese of Bucharest. Born in Jibou, he moved with his family to Drobeta-Turnu Severin, where he finished high school. His parents were Greek-Catholic, but as their church was banned under the communist regime, Damian was raised in the Roman Catholic tradition. He attended the Roman Catholic Theological Institute of Iași and was ordained a priest in 1986 at Saint Joseph's Cathedral in Bucharest. He was assistant priest at the Cioplea Church and from 1987 to 1998 parish priest at another Bucharest parish. He began teaching moral theology in 1991 at a theological institute which opened that year. From 1998 to 2002 he studied canon law at the Pontifical Gregorian University in Rome. In 2002 he was assigned to a new parish and began teaching canon law. In 2003, having been chosen auxiliary bishop by Pope John Paul II, he was consecrated titular bishop of Iziriana at the Bucharest cathedral by Archbishop Ioan Robu.

Notes

External links
Biography in the Archdiocese of Bucharest 
 Catholic Hierarchy – Bishop Cornel Damian

1960 births
People from Jibou
Pontifical Gregorian University alumni
21st-century Roman Catholic bishops in Romania
21st-century Roman Catholic titular bishops
Living people